Sergei Prokofiev wrote the two Pushkin Waltzes (Op. 120) in 1949.

Background
The waltzes were written to a commission from the Moscow Radio Committee, for 1949 was the 150th anniversary of Pushkin's birth.

Movements
The two waltzes (lasting around 8 minutes) are titled:
Allegro espressivo (F major)
Allegro meditativo (C-sharp minor)

Instrumentation
The work is scored for 2 flutes, 2 oboes, cor anglais, 2 clarinets, bass clarinet, 2 bassoons, 4 horns, 2 trumpets, 3 trombones, tuba, timpani, bass drum, snare drum, wood blocks, cymbals, tambourine, triangle, and strings.

Premiere
01-Jan-1952, Moscow (radio performance), conducted by Samuel Samosud.

Recordings

External links
Pushkin Waltzes at prokofiev.org

Compositions by Sergei Prokofiev
Waltzes
1949 compositions